The 2016-17 season of the Liga Portuguesa de Futsal was the 27th season of top-tier futsal in Portugal. It was named Liga Sport Zone for sponsorship reasons. The regular season started on October 8, 2016, and ended on May 6, 2017. After the end of the regular season, the top eight teams played the championship playoffs.

Sporting CP won the competition for the second time in a row, while Sporting Clube de Braga/AAUM made its debut in championship finals. Both teams qualified for 2017–18 UEFA Futsal Cup.

Teams

League table

Title Playoffs

Extra Time = *

See also
Futsal in Portugal

References

Futsal
Portuguese Futsal First Division seasons
Portugal